Hi Impact Planet (also known as  the Hi Impact Amusement park) is an amusement, theme park and resort on the outskirts of Lagos but located in Ogun State along the Lagos–Ibadan Expressway It opened to the public in December, 2015.

Attractions
Attractions in the park include indoor and outdoor as well as wet and dry facilities such as jump around bumper cars, bumber boats; Convoy; Kite flyer 12; Haunted House; King of the Jungle; the Jungle; Vertical Swing  and  Spring ride, Big Buck Panorama, Aliens Armageddon; Transformers Deluxe; Packman Smash; Combat Pump It up Fiesta, a surfing simulated freestyler, hoopla, Mexican fiesta, Samba balloon, dream machine, watermania, Rio train, Boeing 777 outperforming ride,  ice rink, animatronics, including semi-live lions, gorillas. Enterprise ride, souvenir court, eye-combat games, 40-metre high spring ride, ferry spin, Mexican theatre, a 10-seater Hi-Impact airplane. The park occupies an area of about 46 acres. Other facilities in the park includes a clinic, banking services, luxurious hotel, food courts, and a multi-purpose hall of about 7000 capacity and sanitary amenities, 5-D cartoon animation studio, imax cinema.

References

External links

Amusement parks in Nigeria
Tourist attractions in Ogun State
Resorts in Nigeria
2015 establishments in Nigeria
Buildings and structures in Ogun State